Hunayn is an Arabic name.

People named so include:
Hunayn ibn Ishaq (809-73), scholar, physician, and scientist
 Ishaq ibn Hunayn ( – ), physician and translator, son of Hunayn ibn Ishaq